Here is a complete list of songs by the South Korean girl group Girls' Generation.

0–9

A

B

C

D

E

F

G

H

I

K

L

M

N

O

P

R

S

T

V

W

X

Y

Other songs

See also
 Girls' Generation discography

 
Girls' Generation